John Griffith  was a Welsh politician who sat in the House of Commons from 1640. He supported the Royalist cause in the English Civil War.

Griffith was the eldest son of John Griffith and his wife May Trevor, daughter of Sir Richard Trevor of Trevalyn. He was of Llyn.  In November 1640, he was elected Member of Parliament for Carnarvonshire in the Long Parliament and sat until August 1642 when he was disabled from sitting. 
 
Griffith died unmarried in Paris before 1661.

References

Year of birth missing
Year of death missing
Members of the Parliament of England (pre-1707) for constituencies in Wales
Cavaliers
English MPs 1640–1648